Parvathy Omanakuttan (born 13 March 1987) is an Indian actress, model and beauty pageant titleholder who was crowned Miss India 2008 and later became first runner-up at Miss World 2008. She was also awarded the titles of Miss World Asia & Oceania at the Miss World 2008 competition.

Biography
Parvathy Omanakuttan was born in a Malayali family from Changanacherry, Kerala and brought up in Mumbai. She attended Sheth Chunnilal Damodardas Barfiwala High School and later graduated in English Literature from Mithibai College.

Pageant history

Miss World 2008
Parvathy represented India in the 58th Miss World held in Johannesburg, South Africa. On 13 December 2008, she was announced the First Runner Up of Miss World 2008 at The Grand Finale. It was the highest placement of any Indian delegate at the Miss World pageant since Priyanka Chopra's victory at Miss World 2000 , until Manushi Chhillar won Miss World 2017. At the pageant, Parvathy also placed Second in the Top Model and Fifth place in the Beach Beauty sub-contests. She was also awarded the title of  Miss World Asia and Oceania at the pageant.

Miss India 2008 

Parvathy was the winner of Femina Miss India 2008. Since the format of Miss India had changed from 2007, wherein the winner would represent the country at Miss World, Parvathy was conferred the title of  Miss India World 2008 and represented the country at the most prestigious and biggest beauty pageant, Miss World. Parvathy also won the sub-titles of Miss Photogenic, Miss Personality, and Miss Beautiful Hair in the Femina Miss India 2008 pageant.

Miss India South 2008
Parvathy was crowned the first ever Pantaloons Femina Miss India South 2008, at the Hyderabad International Convention Centre held in December 2007. Winning the PFMIS 2008 contest got her direct entry in the top ten finalists of the Pantaloons Femina Miss India 2008. She also won the sub-titles of Miss Beautiful Hair and  Miss Best Catwalk in PFMIS 2008.

Acting career
Parvathy made her cinematic debut through the Bollywood flick United Six directed by Vishal Aryan Singh. She eventually made her Tamil film debut in the 2012 gangster film Billa II, playing Jasmine who, she stated, was "the emotional quotient in David Billa's life". In 2013, she was seen in her first Malayalam film KQ, in which she played a journalist, "a woman of today, strong and independent with her own values".  In August 2013 Parvathy started shooting for the Hindi film Pizza, a remake of the same-titled 2012 Tamil film, produced by Bejoy Nambiar and UTV which was directed by Akshay Akkineni. It released on 18 July 2014, it did very well at the box office.

Filmography

References

External links

 
 
 Miss India – Profile 

1987 births
Living people
Femina Miss India winners
Miss World 2008 delegates
Actresses from Kottayam
Malayali people
Mithibai College alumni
Actresses in Malayalam cinema
Actresses in Tamil cinema
Actresses in Hindi cinema
Beauty pageant contestants from India
Indian film actresses
21st-century Indian actresses
Female models from Kerala
Participants in Indian reality television series
People from Changanassery
Fear Factor: Khatron Ke Khiladi participants